New Panathinaikos Stadium (also known as  Votanikos Stadium) is a football stadium with an additional multi-use sports complex in Athens, Greece, that will host all departments of the Panathinaikos sports club set for completion in 2026. The complex will be located in the historic Votanikos area, west of downtown Athens. The entire project includes the football stadium (seating 39,000), a volleyball, handball and basketball stadium (seating 3,100), swimming pool (seating 500), and gymnastics facilities.

The Votanikos area currently houses mostly vacant, dilapidated storage and industrial facilities.

The football stadium was to be ready for the 100 years of the club in 2008, with the rest of the complex completed by 2011. This construction was the idea of popular former president of Panathinaikos Thanasis Giannakopoulos.

By October 2013, and due to the club's and the country's financial troubles, the construction of the Votanikos Arena had stopped and consequently the plans for the demolition of the Apostolos Nikolaidis Stadium were cancelled.

In 2022, mayor of Athens Kostas Bakogiannis announced that the project is going to be implemented and its construction will last 3 years. The most significant part of the agreement between Panathinaikos and the Municipality of Athens was the fact that the team had to offer Apostolos Nikolaidis Stadium in exchange of its new stadium. After the construction of the arenas, Panathinaikos will be the owner of the entire Votanikos Sport Complex for 99 years. The new football, basketball, volleyball arenas and other facilities will be ready at the start of 2026.

References

Multi-purpose stadiums
Football venues in Greece
Basketball venues in Greece
Volleyball venues in Greece
Sports venues in Athens
Proposed stadiums
Proposed buildings and structures in Greece